Henry Alfred Clapson (5 March 1895 – 6 June 1987) was an Australian rules footballer who played with North Melbourne in the Victorian Football League (VFL).

Notes

External links 

1895 births
1987 deaths
Australian rules footballers from Victoria (Australia)
North Melbourne Football Club players
Norwood Football Club players
Australian military personnel of World War I